Jonathan Austin may refer to:

 Jonathan Austin (filmmaker) (born 1984), American cinematographer
 Jonathan L. Austin (1748–1826), Massachusetts revolutionary, diplomat and politician
 Jonathan Austin (Hawaii official) (1830–1892), Cabinet minister, Kingdom of Hawaii
 Jonathan Luke Austin, political sociologist